Desahogo is the second studio album recorded by Mexican singer/actress Pilar Montenegro. It was released by Fonovisa on September 25, 2001 (see 2001 in music). This album was produced by Rudy Pérez.

The album yielded two singles, "Quítame Ese Hombre", a cover from an old single by Yolandita Monge that became wildly successful in the Latin Market with Pilar's version; and "Alguien Que Una Vez Amé".

Track listing
Track listing from Billboard.com
Cuando Estamos Juntos (Rudy Perez) — 3:43
Alguien Que Una Vez Amé (Rudy Perez) — 4:01
La Puerta del Amor (Rudy Perez/Jorge Luis Piloto) — 3:48
Algo Especial (Rudy Perez/Jorge Luis Piloto) — 4:19
Yo Sé Que Te Amo (Rudy Perez/Jorge Luis Piloto) — 4:08
Quítame Ese Hombre (Jorge Luis Piloto) — 3:48
Desahogo (Roberto Carlos/Erasmo Carlos) — 4:27
Y Volveré (Manuel López de la Fuente/Alan Barriere) — 4:25
Los Ojos No Mienten (Rudy Perez/Mark Portmann) — 3:46
Bella (Bebu Silvetti) — 4:39
Alguien Que Una Vez Amé [Ranchera] — 3:55
Quítame Ese Hombre [Norteña] — 4:02
Cuando Estamos Juntos [Club Mix Radio Edit] — 3:32

Personnel
Jose Behar - Executive Producer
Ed Calle - Arranger
Javier Carrillo - Violin
Victor Di Persia - Recording Engineer
Vicky Echeverri - Vocals (Background)
Jonathon Fuzessy - Director
Beppe Gemelli - Drums
Piero Gemelli - Guitar (Acoustic)
Frank González - Production Coordination
Julio Hernández - Director
Erick Labson - Mastering
Michael Landau - Guitar (Electric)
Lee Levin - Drums
Gary Lindsay - Orchestration
Judd Maher - Conductor
Raúl Midón - Vocals (Background)
Pilar Montenegro - Liner Notes
Joel Numa - Engineer
Mario Patiño - Production Assistant
Wendy Pedersen - Vocals (Background)
Rudy Pérez - Arranger, Liner Notes, Producer, Programming
Clay Perry - Keyboards, Programming
Mark Portmann - Guitar (Acoustic)
Marco Antonio - Santiago	Guitar
Dana Teboe - Trombone
Ramiro Teran - Director, Vocals (Background)
Felipe Tichauer - Engineer
Dan Warner - Bass, Guitar (Electric)
Bruce Weeden - Engineer, Mixing

Sales and certifications

References

2001 albums
Pilar Montenegro albums
Spanish-language albums
Fonovisa Records albums
Albums produced by Rudy Pérez